Francis Cowley (born 28 November 1957) is an English former professional footballer who played in the Football League, as a winger.

References

Footballers from Stepney
English footballers
Association football midfielders
Sutton United F.C. players
Derby County F.C. players
Wimbledon F.C. players
Tooting & Mitcham United F.C. players
Dartford F.C. players
Chelmsford City F.C. players
English Football League players
1957 births
Living people